Javonte Green (born July 23, 1993) is an American-Montenegrin professional basketball player for the Chicago Bulls of the National Basketball Association (NBA). He played college basketball for the Radford Highlanders.

Early life and high school
Green was born and grew up in Petersburg, Virginia, until he was 12 years old, when he moved in to live with his aunt in Alberta, Virginia. He attended Brunswick High School in nearby Lawrenceville, where he played basketball for former Virginia and NBA shooting guard Bryant Stith. As a senior, Green averaged 18.6 points, 5.8 rebounds, 2.3 assists and 3.1 steals per game and led the Bulldogs to the VHSL Group AA Division 3 state title. He was named first team All-State and the Virginia Co-Player of the Year. He committed to play college basketball at Radford University, the only NCAA Division I school to offer him a scholarship. Green also played football at Brunswick and was the team's starting quarterback during his junior and senior years.  Green was offered a scholarship to James Madison University to play football.

College career
Green played for four seasons as a member of the Radford Highlanders. Green entered the starting lineup as a freshman, averaging 10.2 points, 6.7 rebounds and 1.4 steals per game and was named to the Big South Conference's All-Newcomer team. As a sophomore, his first full season as a starter, Green led the Highlanders with 14.6 points and 8.1 rebounds per game and was named Second Team All-Big South. He was named First Team All-Big South after averaged 16.9 points, 8.1 rebounds and 1.9 steals per game while setting the school single season record for steals with 68 in his junior season. As a senior, Green averaged 15.4 points, nine rebounds, and 1.9 steals and was again named First Team All-Big South as well as the conference Defensive Player of the Year. Green finished his collegiate career as Radford's career leader in rebounds (1,064), steals (245), and games played (133) and second all-time in scoring with 1,911 points. On November 28, 2021 his number 2 jersey was retired by the school.

Professional career

Marín Peixegalego (2015–2016)
After going undrafted in the 2015 NBA Draft, Green signed with Marín Peixegalego of the Spanish third division, LEB Plata on September 11, 2015. In his first professional season, Green averaged 18 points, 6.7 rebounds, and 2.2 steals per game and was named the LEB Plata's Most Valuable Player.

Pallacanestro Trieste (2016–2018)
Green signed with Pallacanestro Trieste of the Italian second division, Serie A2 Basket, on July 11, 2016. He averaged 15.6 points, 5.5 rebounds, and 2.4 steals in 45 games with Trieste during the 2016–17 season. He returned to Trieste for a second season, averaging 18.1 points, 7.1 rebounds, 1.4 assists and a league-leading 2.3 steals per game. Following the season, Green was named to the Phoenix Suns NBA Summer League roster.

ratiopharm Ulm (2018–2019)
Green signed with ratiopharm Ulm of the Basketball Bundesliga on July 25, 2018. Green averaged 13.8 points, 4.7 rebounds, 1.6 assists, and 2.3 steals per game in 51 games between league and EuroCup play. He was selected as a reserve to play in the 2019 BBL All-Star Game as a member of the "International" team.

Boston Celtics (2019–2021)
Green was invited to play in the 2019 NBA Summer League as a member of the Boston Celtics roster. He played in all five of the Celtics' games and averaged 10.8 points, 4.8 rebounds, 2.8 assists, and 1.8 steals. The Celtics signed Green to a two year contract with a partially guaranteed salary for the first season. After averaging 9.3 points (on 80% shooting) and 4.0 rebounds in 14.1 minutes played per game in the preseason, Green was named to the Celtics final roster going into the 2019–20 season. Green made his NBA debut on October 25, 2019 against the Toronto Raptors, playing the last five seconds of the first half as a defensive replacement in a 112–106 win. The appearance made him the first former Radford player to play in an NBA game. Green scored his first career points on November 7, 2019 against the Charlotte Hornets, finishing the game with 12 points on 5-of-9 shooting in a 108–87 win. Green made his first NBA start on February 3, 2020 against the Atlanta Hawks, grabbing 3 rebounds with 1 assist and no points in 18 minutes played. On August 25, 2020, Green underwent successful arthroscopic procedure in repairing a small meniscal tear in his right knee and missed the postseason. His son was born the next day, August 26, 2020.

Chicago Bulls (2021–present)
On March 25, 2021, Green was traded to the Chicago Bulls in a three-team trade involving the Washington Wizards. On August 19, 2021, the Chicago Bulls announced that they had re-signed Green.

International career
Green is a dual-citizen of the United States and Montenegro. He made his debut with the Montenegro national basketball team in 2017 during the European 2019 FIBA Basketball World Cup qualifiers, averaging 11 points, 4.5 rebounds and four steals in two games.

Career statistics

NBA

Regular season

|-
| style="text-align:left;"| 
| style="text-align:left;"| Boston
| 48 || 2 || 9.8 || .500 || .273 || .667 || 1.9 || .5 || .5 || .2 || 3.4
|-
| style="text-align:left;" rowspan=2| 
| style="text-align:left;"| Boston
| 25 || 2 || 13.8 || .549 || .318 || .667 || 2.1 || .4 || .7 || .1 || 4.2
|-
| style="text-align:left;"| Chicago
| 16 || 0 || 8.0 || .452 || .375 || 1.000 || 1.2 || .4 || .6 || .3 || 2.6
|-
| style="text-align:left;"| 
| style="text-align:left;"| Chicago
| 65 || 45 || 23.4 || .542 || .356 || .833 || 4.2 || .9 || 1.0 || .5 || 7.2
|- class="sortbottom"
| style="text-align:center;" colspan="2"| Career
| 154 || 49 || 16.0 || .528 || .335 || .775 || 2.9 || .7 || .8 || .3 || 5.0

Playoffs

|-
| style="text-align:left;"|2020
| style="text-align:left;"|Boston
| 1 || 0 || 6.0 || .500 || .500 || — || 1.0 || .0 || .0 || .0 || 3.0
|-
| style="text-align:left;"|2022
| style="text-align:left;"|Chicago
| 5 || 1 || 14.4 || .176 || .000 || .500 || 3.0 || .4 || 1.8 || .0 || 1.4
|- class="sortbottom"
| style="text-align:center;" colspan="2"|Career
| 6 || 1 || 13.0 || .211 || .125 || .500 || 2.7 || .3 || 1.5 || .0 || 1.7

College

|-
| style="text-align:left;"| 2011–12
| style="text-align:left;"| Radford
| 32|| 22 || 22.0 || .467 || .194 || .618 || 6.7 || .6 || 1.4 || .5 || 10.2
|-
| style="text-align:left;"| 2012–13
| style="text-align:left;"| Radford
| 32 || 32 || 27.7 || .504 || .192 || .592 || 8.1 || 1.3 || 2.1 || .7 || 14.6
|-
| style="text-align:left;"| 2013–14
| style="text-align:left;"| Radford
| 35 || 34 ||  25.6 || .548|| .343 || .686 || 8.1 || 1.1 || 1.9 || .6 || 16.9
|-
| style="text-align:left;"| 2014–15
| style="text-align:left;"| Radford
| 34 || 34 || 26.2 || .544|| .111 || .697 || 9.0 || 1.3 || 1.9|| .9 || 15.4
|- class="sortbottom"
| style="text-align:center;" colspan="2"| Career
| 133|| 122 || 25.4 || .519 || .238 || .656 || 8.0 || 1.1 || 1.8 || .7 || 14.4

Personal life
Green has two daughters and one son.

References

External links
Radford Highlanders bio
RealGM profile

1993 births
Living people
21st-century African-American sportspeople
African-American basketball players
American emigrants to Montenegro
American expatriate basketball people in Germany
American expatriate basketball people in Italy
American expatriate basketball people in Spain
American men's basketball players
Basketball players from Virginia
Boston Celtics players
Chicago Bulls players
Montenegrin expatriate basketball people in Italy
Montenegrin men's basketball players
Montenegrin people of African-American descent
Naturalized citizens of Montenegro
Pallacanestro Trieste players
People from Brunswick County, Virginia
Radford Highlanders men's basketball players
Ratiopharm Ulm players
Shooting guards
Small forwards
Undrafted National Basketball Association players